Amit Yoran is chairman and chief executive officer of Tenable, a position held since January 3, 2017. Previously, Yoran was president of computer and network security company RSA.

Yoran joined RSA during his tenure as CEO of NetWitness Corp., which was acquired by RSA's parent company, EMC, in April 2011. Prior to his time at NetWitness, Yoran was the National Cyber Security Division director within the United States Department of Homeland Security.  He took up the post in September 2003 and served as the initial director of the US-CERT.  He resigned in October 2004.

Earlier in his career, Yoran was a co-founder and CEO of Riptech, which was acquired by Symantec in August 2002. He has also served on the board of directors of Cyota (acquired by RSA), Guardium (acquired by IBM), Guidance Software (GUID), and other internet security technology companies.

Yoran is a graduate of the United States Military Academy and served as one of the founding members of the US Department of Defense's Computer Emergency Response Team.  He has a master's degree in computer science..

References

United States Department of Homeland Security officials
Living people
George W. Bush administration personnel
Year of birth missing (living people)